NAGA Group is a German fintech company that provides an investing app with an inbuilt social network. The company's headquarters is located in Hamburg, Germany. It was listed on the Frankfurt Stock Exchange in 2017. NAGA was heavily criticized by the newspaper Die Welt as the risky platform for social trading where users lose their money.

NAGA Group AG is the holding company of NAGA Markets Europe Ltd, NAGA Technology GmbH, and NAGA Global Ltd.

History 
NAGA was founded by Benjamin Bilski and Yasin Sebastian Qureshi in Germany in 2015. The first products released by the team were trading social network SwipeStox.

In 2017, NAGA Group AG was listed on the Frankfurt Stock Exchange and was included in the list of Red Herring 100 2017 Winners. The German magazine Capital.de criticized NAGA's ICO process right after its IPO in 2017, saying that it was made in a hurry and was suspiciously quick.

In 2021, the company launched NAGA Pay, a mobile banking and investing app that combines an IBAN account, a VISA debit card, a share deposit, copy trading, and physical crypto wallets.

NAGA Group AG develops a social investing platform (with 1 million users), crypto platform and a mobile banking and investing app.

In October 2022, The NAGA Capital Ltd obtains a Seychelles license.

Fosun International, a Chinese holding company, is a shareholder of NAGA since 2017.

References 

Companies listed on the Frankfurt Stock Exchange